Events from the year 1523 in Sweden

Events

 May - The Swedes takes Kalmar from the Danes  after the Conquest of Kalmar.
 June - Gustav Vasa is elected King in Strängnäs and the Kalmar Union is thereby formally dissolved.
 June - The city of Stockholm is taken by the Swedes after the Conquest of Stockholm. 
 June - Stockholm Castle is taken by the Swedes. 
 June - Gustav Vasa make his formal entry to Stockholm and is celebrated as King. 
 November - The last Danish-held stronghold in Sweden–Finland, Viborg Castle, is taken by the Swedes.

Births

Deaths

References

 
Years of the 16th century in Sweden
Sweden